Xavier Bouvier (born 4 January 1957) is a Swiss sports shooter. He competed at the 1992 Summer Olympics and the 1996 Summer Olympics.

References

1957 births
Living people
Swiss male sport shooters
Olympic shooters of Switzerland
Shooters at the 1992 Summer Olympics
Shooters at the 1996 Summer Olympics
Place of birth missing (living people)